Luis Ricardo Villalobos Hernández (born 26 June 1998) is a Mexican cyclist, provisionally suspended from the sport due to an adverse analytical finding (AAF) for GHRP-6 in 2019.

Villalobos joined  in July 2019, after two-and-a-half seasons with the  team.

Major results

2014
 National Novice Road Championships
1st  Road race
1st  Time trial
2015
 1st  Road race, Pan American Junior Road Championships
 National Junior Road Championships
1st  Road race
1st  Time trial
 5th Overall Tour de l'Abitibi
2016
 Pan American Junior Road Championships
1st  Time trial
2nd  Road race
 National Junior Road Championships
1st  Road race
1st  Time trial
 2nd Overall Sint-Martinusprijs Kontich
1st  Points classification
1st Stage 2
 2nd Overall Niedersachsen Rundfahrt
 7th Overall Oberösterreich Juniorenrundfahrt
2017
 1st  Young rider classification Cascade Cycling Classic
 2nd Time trial, National Road Championships
 2nd Road race, National Under-23 Road Championships
2018
 1st  Time trial, National Road Championships
 5th Chrono Kristin Armstrong
 8th Overall Tour of Utah
1st  Young rider classification
2019
 1st  Time trial, National Road Championships
 3rd Winston-Salem Cycling Classic

References

External links

1998 births
Living people
Mexican male cyclists